The Shibanpo Yangtze River Bridge consists of a pair of prestressed concrete box girder bridges over the Yangtze River in Chongqing, China. The bridges carries 8 lanes of traffic on Jiangnan Avenue between the Nan'an District south of the Yangtze River and the Yuzhong District to the north.

Original Bridge
Construction of the original bridge began in November 1977. The bridge cost RMB 64.68 million and was opened to traffic on the 1st of July 1980. The bridge was the first road bridge over the Yangtze River in Chongqing. The bridge carried two lanes of traffic in each direction.

Second Bridge
In 2003 construction began on the second four lane bridge to the west of the existing bridge to meet growing traffic demands. The new bridge was completed in 2006 at a cost of approximately US$40 million. The main span of the new bridge was manufactured in the Wuchang District of Wuhan. Placement of the piers due to the close proximity to the existing bridge necessitated a longer span; the bridge's main span of  makes it the largest box girder bridge in the world, displacing the previous record holder, the Stolma Bridge. When the bridge was opened southbound traffic was moved onto the new bridge and all four lanes of the original bridge were used for northbound traffic.

See also

Yangtze River bridges and tunnels

References

http://www.dormanlongtechnology.com/en/projects/Shibanpo.htm
http://en.structurae.de/structures/data/index.cfm?id=s0011456

Bridges in Chongqing
Bridges completed in 1980
Bridges completed in 2005
Box girder bridges in China
Concrete bridges
Bridges over the Yangtze River